Hessle railway station serves the town of Hessle in the East Riding of Yorkshire, England. The station, and all trains serving it, are operated by Northern.

This is the nearest station on the north bank of the Humber to the Humber Bridge and good views of the structure can be had from the platforms when looking west. The platforms were originally aligned as to serve the outer lines only when the railway was quadrupled early in the 20th century, but following the removal of the outer lines in the early 1970s by British Rail, they were extended out to meet the surviving centre tracks.

Facilities

The station is unstaffed and it does have a ticket machine - intending passengers may still buy their ticket in advance or on the train. The main building is still present but not in railway use, though the old NER shelter on the eastbound side is still available (a more modern structure is provided on the other side). Step-free access is available to both platforms via ramps from the nearby road (east side) and the footbridge (west side).  Timetable posters, passenger information screens and a telephone provide train running details.

Services

A limited number of trains to/from  call at peak periods.

There is a very limited service (two eastbound and three westbound trains) on Sundays.

References

External links

Railway stations in the East Riding of Yorkshire
DfT Category F2 stations
Railway stations in Great Britain opened in 1840
Northern franchise railway stations
Hessle
Former Hull and Selby Railway stations